Satwant Singh (1962 – 6 January 1989) was one of the bodyguards, along with Beant Singh, who assassinated the Prime Minister of India, Indira Gandhi, at her New Delhi residence on 31 October 1984.

Assassination
The motivation for the assassination of Indira Gandhi was revenge for the military attack carried out by the Indian government on Harmandir Sahib, in Amritsar, India.

Beant Singh drew a .38 revolver and fired three shots into Indira Gandhi's abdomen; as she fell to the ground, Satwant Singh fired all 30 rounds from his Sten automatic weapon into her abdomen (thus, 33 bullets were fired in total, of which 30 bullets hit her). Both assassins subsequently dropped their weapons and surrendered.

Beant Singh was shot to death during interrogation in custody soon after the assassination. Satwant Singh was arrested and later sentenced to death by hanging along with co-conspirator Kehar Singh. In his court statement, Satwant Singh appealed for end to communal violence in the country, while pinning the blame for the same on Indira and Rajiv Gandhi. The sentence was carried out on 6 January 1989.

Aftermath
The assassination of Gandhi brought their immediate families into the limelight, resulting in their winning two Lok Sabha seats from state of Punjab. The Lok Sabha is a directly elected 543 member  house of the Parliament of India.

In the aftermath of the executions of Satwant Singh and Kehar Singh, communal violence occurred in Punjab, resulting in 14 Hindus being killed by militants.
In 2003, a Bhog ceremony was held at the highest Sikh temporal seat in Akal Takht, located in the Golden Temple Complex in Amritsar, where tributes were paid to Indira Gandhi's assassins.

In 2004, the anniversary of his death was again observed at Akal Takhat, Amritsar, where his mother was honored by the head priest and tributes were paid to Satwant Singh and Kehar Singh by various political parties. In 2007, the death anniversaries of Satwant Singh and his wife were observed in various parts of Punjab and other countries. On 6 January 2008, the Akal Takht declared Beant Singh and Satwant Singh "martyrs of Sikhism", while the SGPC also labeled them "martyrs of the Sikh nation".

The Sikh-centric political party in India, Shiromani Akali Dal, observed the death anniversary of Beant Singh and Satwant Singh as "martyrdom" for the first time on 31 October 2008. Every 31 October since, this date has been observed at Sri Akal Takht Sahib.

A film called Kaum de Heere was made about him in 2014.

Personal life
Singh's father was Tarlok Singh. He married Surinder Kaur (daughter of Virsa Singh) on 2 May 1988 while he was in prison. His fiancé wed him in absentia by marrying his photo in an Anand Karaj.

References

1962 births
1989 deaths
People executed by India by hanging
People from Gurdaspur
Executed Indian people
Indian Sikhs
20th-century executions by India
People convicted of murder by India
Executed assassins
Assassins of heads of government
Punjabi people
Assassination of Indira Gandhi
Inmates of Tihar Jail
Bodyguards
Security guards convicted of crimes
1984 murders in India
People executed for murder